Ahırlıkuyu, Haymana  is a village in the District of Haymana, Ankara Province, Turkey.

Population 
 there are 58 inhabitants in the village of Ahırlıkuyu, down from 201 inhabitants in 1985.

References

Villages in Haymana District